(born 21 June 1974) is a Japanese snowboarder. Born in Osaka Prefecture, her career-high has so far been a 3rd-place finish in the 2005 Nokia Snowboard FIS World Cup held in Canada.

She competed in the Women's Halfpipe in the 2006 Winter Olympics in Turin, Italy. Fushimi qualified for the competition's final, which was held on 13 February, but only finished 12th with a score of 15.6.

References
External links last verified on 14 February 2006 
2006 Olympics profile
Japanese Olympic Committee profile (Japanese)

Living people
1974 births
People from Osaka Prefecture
Olympic snowboarders of Japan
Japanese female snowboarders
Snowboarders at the 2006 Winter Olympics
21st-century Japanese women